Wayne Scholes is a British businessman, the CEO of Red Touch Media and the former owner of ice hockey club the Telford Tigers.

References

Date of birth missing (living people)
Living people
British businesspeople
People from Telford
Telford Tigers
Year of birth missing (living people)